Pani-Dihing Bird Sanctuary is a  bird sanctuary located in Sivasagar district, Assam. This protected area was established as a Bird Sanctuary in August 1996 by the Government of Assam. It was identified as a potential bird sanctuary in late 1980s. The first systematic ornithological surveys in the area was conducted by noted conservationist Dr Anwaruddin Choudhury in 1987-88. Pani-Dihing is a complex of grassland and wetland. Some of the wetlands including channels or beels include Tokia, Jarjaria, Boloma, Dighali, Singorajan, Sagunpora, Kandhulijan, Fulai and Gaiguma. A detailed background of Pani-Dihing has also been published. Pani-Dihing and adjacent areas is on the global map being an Important Bird & Biodiversity Area

Climate
The climate of the area is tropical monsoon and annual temperature ranges between 7-38 degree Celsius annually. Annual rainfall is approximately 2400–3200 mm with a relative humidity of 65-85 %.

Rivers 
The sanctuary is bordered by the Brahmaputra and the Disang rivers in the north west and south  respectively.

Fauna 
As many as 267 species of birds including 70 species of migratory birds have been identified and recorded at Pani Dihing. Some notable birds seen here are bar-headed goose, greylag goose, Indian spot-billed duck, mallard, gadwall, wigeon, garganey, shoveller, red-crested pochard, common pochard, ferruginous duck, greater adjutant stork, lesser adjutant stork, open-bill stork, white-necked stork, glossy ibis, grey plover, Himalayan griffon and white-rumped vulture Assam's first record of bank myna was from Pani-Dihing. Among mammals, there were past records of great Indian one-horned rhinoceros and tiger. Wild elephants, hog deer, rhesus monkey and otters

Threats 
Although an important birding area supporting a very large population of birds, Pani-Dihing has suffered on account of poaching, grazing of cattle and fishing within the sanctuary premises.

See also
 Protected areas of Assam

References

External links
 Pani Dihing Wildlife Sanctuary at assaminfo.com.

Wildlife sanctuaries in Assam
Sivasagar district
Protected areas established in 1996
1996 establishments in Assam